Norwegian football teams have entered Union of European Football Associations (UEFA) club competitions every season since 1960. Nineteen clubs have represented Norway in four official tournaments: the Champions League (originally the European Cup), the Europa League (originally the UEFA Cup), the Cup Winners' Cup and the Intertoto Cup, the latter two which are now defunct. Rosenborg has participated in thirty seasons, more than any other Norwegian team, while Fyllingen, Gjøvik-Lyn, Haugar and Kongsvinger have only participated once each. No Norwegian teams have ever advanced past the quarter-finals of any tournament, with Rosenborg, Lyn, Brann, Vålerenga and Bodø/Glimt having reached one quarter-final each.

Fredrikstad made Norway's debut by winning over Ajax in the 1960–61 European Cup. They would represent Norway for the first three seasons until Lyn took the place in 1963–64. The same year Gjøvik-Lyn debuted for Norway in the Cup Winners' Cup. Rosenborg made Norway's debut in the UEFA Cup in 1971. In 93 entries between 1960 and 1992, Norwegian clubs only succeeded at advancing past the first fixture sixteen times, and only once past the second, when Lyn reached the 1968–69 European Cup Winners' Cup quarter-finals. From 1993 Norwegian clubs started advancing past the first rounds more regularly. Rosenborg reached the group stage of the 1995–96 UEFA Champions League and would qualify for that level eight consecutive times and eleven in total. The following season Rosenborg reached the quarter-finals, the same season as Brann reached the quarter-finals of the Cup Winners' Cup. Vålerenga would match the feat in the 1998–99 UEFA Cup Winners' Cup. The following year Molde qualified to bring two teams to the group stage of the 1999–2000 UEFA Champions League. The 2005–06 season saw Rosenborg play in the Champions League group stage and both Viking and Tromsø play in the UEFA Cup group stage. Rosenborg is the only team qualify for the UEFA Cup by winning all its matches in the Intertoto Cup, an achievement they completed in 2008. Since 2010 only Molde have managed to progress past the group stage in any competition, reaching the round of 32 in the 2015–16 Europa League and the round of 16 in 2020–21.

Werder Bremen has eliminated Norwegian teams a record five times out of five attempts. Linfield has played Norwegian teams a record seven times, with the team being eliminated a record five times. Viking holds a Norwegian record 18–0 victory Principat from 1999, while Leeds United served a Norwegian record 0–16 defeat for Lyn in 1969.

Results
Key

 (a.e.t.) = Match determined after extra time
 (a) = Match determined via away goals rule
 (pen.) = Match determined via penalty shoot-out
 (wo) = Walkover
 GS = Group stage
 G1 = First group stage
 G2 = Second group stage
 PO = Play-off round
 R1 = First Round
 R2 = Second Round

 R3 = Third Round
 R32 = Round of 32
 R16 = Round of 16
 QF = Quarter-finals
 QR = Qualification round
 Q1 = First qualification round
 Q2 = Second qualification round
 Q3 = Third qualification round

References

 
European football clubs in international competitions
Eliteserien